Neomintho is a genus of flies in the family Tachinidae.

References

Tachinidae
Taxa named by Friedrich Moritz Brauer
Taxa named by Julius von Bergenstamm